This is a discography of LP releases by the Louisville Orchestra on First Edition Records, and CD releases on First Edition Records and the First Edition Music label.

References
First Edition Records at Discogs
First Edition Music at Discogs
First Edition Music at Naxos
Background on First Edition Music

Classical music record labels